Campus Man is a 1987 American comedy film directed by Ron Casden and written by Geoffrey Baere and Matt Dorff. The film stars John Dye, Steven Lyon, Kim Delaney, Kathleen Wilhoite, Miles O'Keeffe and Morgan Fairchild. The film was released on April 10, 1987, by Paramount Pictures.

Plot
Todd Barrett is an aspiring businessman.  He has got what it takes, but what he doesn't have is enough money to stay in college.  So, he cooks up a plan to make the first ever all-male sports calendar.  He eventually convinces Cactus Jack, a very shadowy and tough loan shark, to give him money to make the deal.  Todd makes enough to pay for his education, but what about the money he owes Cactus Jack?

Cast

John Dye as Todd Barrett
Steven Lyon as Brett Wilson 
Kim Delaney as Dayna Thomas
Kathleen Wilhoite as Molly Gibson
Miles O'Keeffe as Cactus Jack
Morgan Fairchild as Katherine Van Buren
John Welsh as Professor Jarman
Josef Rainer as Charles McCormick
Richard Alexander as Mr. Bowersox
Steve Archer as Coach Waters
Eden Brandy as Party Girl
Marty Miller as Party Animal
Gayn Erickson as Student #1
Zibby Miles as Student #2
Isabelle Bailey as Student #3
Paul Mancuso as Student #4
Jason Scott as Checker
Bob G. Anthony as Loan Officer	
Deborah Dee as Graffiti's Girl 
Lorin Young as Muffy
Cheli Ann Chew as Buffy 
Mark Curtis as Newscaster
Bill Stull	as Newscaster 
Tracy Tanen as Apartment Girl
Ivan E. Schwarz as Purvis
James Sanich as Uniformed Cop
Danny Sullivan as Financial Manager
Stuart Grant as Mr. Jackson
Janet Osgood as Announcer
Tiny Wells as Thug #1
Henry Tank as Thug #2
Linda Williams as TV Reporter
Val Ross as Bookstore Manager
Holly Davis  as Girl in Bookstore
David Fopiano as Student at Pool
Julie Lamm as Girl in Stands
Larry Swanson as Nerd #1
Michael Byun as Nerd #2
Michael Spiller as Undercover Cop
Ellen Ruffalo as Fashion Editor
Charley Gilleran as Telephone Repairman
Kristen Danielson as Usherette
Scott P. Anthony as Diver
Duwan Erickson as Diver
Randy Mastey as Diver
Ron Piemonte as Diver
Bill Travis as Diver
Jim Sullivan as Diver
Steve Voelker as Calendar Man
Christopher Ambrose as Calendar Man
James A. Quistorff as Calendar Man
D. Sidney Potter as Calendar Man
Robert Donahue as Calendar Man
Ricky Austin Hill as Calendar Man
David T. Moran as Calendar Man
John Jaqua as Calendar Man
Brad Huestis as Calendar Man
Guy R. Vick as Calendar Man
Mark P. Bastin as Calendar Man 
Lisa A. Otto as Boom Box Hand/Extra

Reception
The film grossed $319,218 in its opening weekend.

References

External links
 

1987 comedy films
1987 films
Films produced by Jon Landau
Films scored by James Newton Howard
Films set in universities and colleges
RKO Pictures films
American comedy films
Paramount Pictures films
1980s English-language films
1980s American films